Chamcook Mountain is located  from St. Andrews, Charlotte County, New Brunswick, Canada.

Etymology
Chamcook is derived from the Passamaquoddy word of K'tchumcook which, according to William Francis Ganong, has many meanings but none are certain.

References

Landforms of Charlotte County, New Brunswick
Mountains of New Brunswick
Mountains of Canada under 1000 metres